Aqarib (also known as Aqarib al-Safiyah is a town in northern Syria, administratively part of the Hama Governorate, located  east of Hama at the edge of the Syrian Desert.  Nearby localities include Salamiyah and Tell al-Tut to the southwest, Uqayribat to the southeast and Sabburah to the north. According to the Syria Central Bureau of Statistics, Aqarib had a population of 3,830 in the 2004 census. Its inhabitants are predominantly Ismailis.

Aqarib was founded in the late 19th century by Ismaili migrants from the area of Shaizar, a town west of Hama. The Ismailis had been evicted from their homes by a prominent landowning family based in Hama who owned the area around Shaizar. Part of the reason the migrants chose to settle in Aqarib was its proximity to Salamiyah, the center of Ismaili life in Syria.

References

Populated places established in the 19th century
Populated places in Salamiyah District
19th-century establishments in the Ottoman Empire
Ismaili communities in Syria